Předslav is a municipality and village in Klatovy District in the Plzeň Region of the Czech Republic. It has about 800 inhabitants.

Administrative parts
Villages of Hůrka, Makov, Měcholupy, Němčice, Petrovičky and Třebíšov are administrative parts of Předslav.

References

Villages in Klatovy District